The sixth and final season of Private Practice premiered on September 25, 2012, with a limited run of thirteen episodes. Private Practice was renewed for a sixth season on May 11, 2012. 

In an interview, Shonda Rhimes stated that this season will feature: "a death, some babies, a likely return of a favorite and there could possibly be a wedding" with the rumored possibility of a musical episode and return of ex-cast member Audra McDonald.

On October 19, 2012, after months of speculation, series creator Shonda Rhimes announced that the sixth season would be the final season of the show. It was confirmed that production wrapped on December 7, 2012, and that the final episode had been taped.

Development
Private Practice was renewed by ABC for a sixth season, that was to have a limited number of thirteen episodes, on May 11, 2012. In July 2012, it was announced that Private Practice would premiere on September 25, 2012. On October 19, 2012, after months of speculation, series creator Shonda Rhimes announced that the sixth season would be the final season of the show. In late December 2012, it was announced that the series finale of Private Practice would air on January 22, 2013, and would feature Addison's wedding to Jake Reilly. After the finale, Shonda Rhimes spoke out stating, "The entire SEASON was a finale. Each episode (dedicated to each character) worked to wrap up their series-long arcs," and "Also, I had a very strong desire to NOT end the show. Not in the traditional where characters die or move away or shut down the practice," in response to fans stating that they didn't believe it was a true finale.

Cast

Main cast
 Kate Walsh as Dr. Addison Montgomery
 Benjamin Bratt as Dr. Jake Reilly
 Paul Adelstein as Dr. Cooper Freedman
 KaDee Strickland as Dr. Charlotte King
 Brian Benben as Dr. Sheldon Wallace
 Caterina Scorsone as Dr. Amelia Shepherd
 Griffin Gluck as Mason Warner
 Taye Diggs as Dr. Sam Bennett
 Amy Brenneman as Dr. Violet Turner

Recurring cast
 Matt Long as Dr. James Peterson
 Justina Machado as Stephanie Kemp
 Carter MacIntyre as Nick Calhoun
 Charlie Hofheimer as Ron Nelson
 Chryssie Whitehead as Dana Nelson
 Diane Farr as Miranda
 Aloma Wright as Mildred Clemons
 Missy Yager as Megan Stewart
 Emily Rios as Angela Reilly
 Marianne Jean-Baptiste as Gabi Rivera
 Blue Deckert as Joe Price
 Kylie Rogers as Sarah Nelson
 Jack Bobo and Joey Bobo as Lucas Wilder
 Emily Moss Wilson as Judi

Guest stars
 Audra McDonald as Dr. Naomi Bennett
 Alex Rocco as Ed Diamanti
 Robert Pine as Jim Wallace
 Richard Roundtree as Raymond McCray
 L. Scott Caldwell as Jillian McCray
 Alfre Woodard as Dee Bennett
 Deanna Dunagan as Dr. Vivian Carlsmith
 Marisol Nichols as Lily Reilly
 Lee Garlington as Stella Peterson
 Faran Tahir as Charles

Following the renewal of Private Practice, it was announced that Tim Daly would not be returning to the show because of budgetary reasons, and his character would be killed off in the season premiere. In June 2012, Kate Walsh announced that she would be leaving Private Practice after this season, but suggested that the show could still go on without her. Cast mates Benjamin Bratt, Paul Adelstein, KaDee Strickland, Brian Benben, Caterina Scorsone, Griffin Gluck, Taye Diggs, and Amy Brenneman all returned as their characters for the sixth season. In September 2012, it was announced that actor Matt Long had been cast in a recurring role as James Peterson, the new ER attending, and a potential love interest for Amelia. In September 2012, it was announced that Alfre Woodard was cast as Sam's mother, Dee Bennett. After months of speculation it was announced that Audra McDonald was to return during the season finale, and reprise her role as Naomi Bennett. In November 2012, it was announced that Diane Farr was cast in a recurring role, for the last three episodes of the series, as Miranda, a love interest for Sheldon.

Plots
In the sixth-season premiere, Violet finds out that Pete hasn't shown up for court and assumes that he ran off, only to find out later that he had a heart attack jogging and died. Charlotte finds outs that she's pregnant but is happy because her IUD will most likely destroy the pregnancy, only to find out she's pregnant with triplets. As Charlotte and Cooper deal with having triplets, Violet has to cope with Pete's death and trying to raise her son by herself. Sheldon deals with the fact that he has prostate cancer, and falls in love with a fellow cancer patient who is terminal. Addison tries to make her relationship with Jake work while running into snags trying to adopt Henry, and she eventually proposes to Jake. Amelia, still dealing with the trauma of delivering a child without a brain, finally decides to give love another try when she meets a handsome ER doctor. Naomi's return complicates things for herself and Sam.

Reception
Private Practice's sixth season opened up to 6.45 million viewers with a 1.9/5 Nielsen rating/share in the 18–49 demographic. As of December 2012 "Aftershock" has served as the season's most viewed episode. "The Next Episode" so far is the seasons' and series' least watched episode, with 3.72 million viewers. In December 2012, TVGuide rated the final season of Private Practice with a B− grade, stating that Shonda Rhimes gave the series exactly what it needed when the series was beginning to feel 'stale'.

Episode list

Webisodes

Ratings

Live ratings

Live +7 Day (DVR) ratings

DVD release

References

2012 American television seasons
2013 American television seasons
Private Practice (TV series) seasons